Neden (Why?) is Candan Erçetin's fourth studio album. It was released in March 2002. This album had significant differences with her previous works, as she was no longer working with Mete Özgencil. Instead, the album has songs mostly written by herself and Aylin Atalay. She proved her success in music-writing as well as performing. The CD version of the album has a cover with fragrance, the first of its kind in Turkey.

Track listing

Personnel 
Topkapı Müzik – production
Rıza Erekli – producer
Candan Erçetin – vocals, songwriter, composer, drums, goblet drum, Turkish tambur
Alper Erinç – composer, arranger, drums, guitar, mandolin, trumpet, Pro Tools editing
Aylin Atalay – songwriter
Sinan – songwriter
Ümit Aksu – songwriter
Bülent Erinç – arranger
Neslihan Engin – composer, arranger, tambur, production assistant
Özgür Buldum – arranger
Tansel Doğanay – arranger, accordion
Özcan Şenyaylar – accordion, violin, bowed string instrument composition
Muzaffer Şenyaylar – qanun
Şenyaylar Grubu – bowed string instruments
Günay Uysal – cello
Mustafa Süder – violin
Kirpi Bülent – clarinet
Hüsnü Şenlendirici – clarinet
Ali Yılmaz – cümbüş
Tolga Görsev – drums, tambur, vocals, recording (all except "Ben Böyleyim")
Başar Yakupoğlu – recording assistant (all except "Ben Böyleyim")
Nihal Bilgen – recording assistant (all except "Ben Böyleyim")
Gürsan Acar (Tomwelt Studios, Berlin) – mastering
Cengiz Ercümer – goblet drum
Can Şengün – guitar
Murat Ejder – guitar
Murat Matthew Erdem – recording
Seyfi Ayta – tambur, daf
Erkut Gökgöz – trumpet
Bozkurt Bayer – art director
Hakan Aydoğan – photography
Hakan Köse Difference – hair, make-up
Ali Özel – hair, make-up
Kerime Tekin – hair, make-up
Onur Ofset – printing
Credits adapted from Nedens album booklet.

Release history

Notes 
 A  On the album's cover, it is mentioned that the composer of the second song, "Neden", is anonymous, however, the composers are in fact Attie Bauw and Yulduz Usmonova. The composition was first used in Usmonova's 1999 album Dünya (1999) for the song "Deme".

References

Candan Erçetin albums
2002 albums